Embrujada is a 1969 Argentine sexploitation horror film directed by Armando Bó.

Cast
Isabel Sarli as Ansisé
Víctor Bó as Juan
Daniel de Alvarado as Leandro
C. Adolpho Chadler as Jacinto
Miguel A. Olmos as Peralta
Gilberto Sierra as Doctor
Josefina Danieli as Doña Marculina
Sonia Brasil as Mujer

External links
 

1969 films
1960s erotic drama films
Argentine erotic drama films
1960s Spanish-language films
1969 drama films
Sexploitation films
Folk horror films
1960s Argentine films